Georges Adéagbo (born 1942) is a Beninese sculptor known for his work with found objects.

A native of Cotonou, Adéagbo studied law in Abidjan before moving to France to continue his studies.  He returned to Benin in 1971 upon the death of his father, and began creating installations and environments in isolation from family and society.  By the early 1990s, he had begun to receive recognition, culminating in the reception of the Prize of Honor at the Venice Biennale in 1999. Adéagbo gathers the material for his art wherever he travels.

Collections

Toyota Municipal Museum of Art 2000 and 2004, Museum Ludwig Cologne 2003, Blake Byrne, Los Angeles 1999 (donated to L.A. MoCA spring 2005), Galerie Elisabeth Kaufmann, Zurich 2005, Philadelphia Museum of Art 2006, Ulmer Museum 2007, Oslo National Museum of Art, Architecture and Design 2009, MAK Vienna 2009, MUSAC Leon 2011, KIASMA Helsinki 2011, GIZ Regional Office Cotonou 2012, Collection Cecile Fakhoury Abidjan 2013, Whitworth Art Gallery, The University of Manchester 2013.

Exhibitions

Solo Exhibitions

1997

'Death and Resurrection' (La mort et la résurrection) Galerie Natalie Obadia, Paris
'Redemption, the Redeemer' (la rédemption, le rédempteur) le Quartier, centre d'art contemporain, Quimper, France

2000

'La rencontre de l'Afrique et du Japon' Toyota Municipal Museum of Art.
'Abraham, l'ami de Dieu'  P.S.1, New York, Long Island City.

2001

'L'Epoque Pythagoreene' Galerie im Taxispalais, Innsbruck

2004

'"L'explorateur et les explorateurs devant l'histoire de l'exploration".. !-Le théâtre du monde.. !' Museum Ludwig, Köln
'Le Socialisme Africain', Ikon Gallery, Birmingham

2005

'Dieu-créateur dans la création' und 'AC-DC Archiv des Museum Ludwig' Galerie Elisabeth Kaufmann Zürich

2007

"Tout de Moi à Tous", Daadgallery Berlin
"La rencontre..!" Venise-Florence. Fondazione Querini Stampalia-Venice, Italy

2008

"La rencontre..!" Venise-Florence, Palazzo Vecchio and Gallery Frittelli, Florence, Italy
"La Belgique au Congo" Sint Lukas Galerie, Brussels, Belgium

2009

„Die Kolonisation und die Geschichte der Kolonisierten" MAK, Vienna, Austria

2010
 
"La Culture et les Cultures – La Chine a Hambourg", Galerie Holzhauer, Hamburg, Germany

2011

"La Mission et les Missionaires", MUSAC, Leon, Spain

2013
 
"Il était un fois, Košice: Košice d'hier, Košice d'aujourd'hui..!" Make-Up Gallery, Košice – Slovakia

Group Exhibitions

1994
 
'Archaeology' (L'archeologie), in 'La Route de l'art sur la Route de l'esclave', Saline Royale d'Arc-et-Senans, France
(traveling in 1997 to : Centre culturel du SESC Pompeia, São Paulo, Brazil, 1998: Musée d'art moderne, Santo Domingo, Dominican Republic, and Centre culturel de Fond Saint-Jacques, Sainte-Marie, Martinique, 1999)
Artchipel, scène nationale de la Guadeloupe, France

1995
 
'Peace in the World' (La paix dans le monde) "Dialog des Friedens", Palais of the United Nations, Geneva, Switzerland
'Art and Evolution', (L'art et l'evolution) "Big City", The Serpentine Gallery, London, UK
'Archaeology' (L'archeologie) "African Artists and Aids", Centre Culturel Français, Cotonou, Benin; The Dakar Biennial, Senegal

1996
 
'Images of Africa' (Les images de l'afrique) "African Art towards the Year 2000", Round Tower, Copenhagen, Denmark
'The Renaissance' (La renaissance) Galerie du jour Agnès B., Paris, France

1997

Johannesburg Biennial
'Contemporary Art and Modern Art' (L'art contemporain et l'art moderne) "Georges Adéagbo and Honoré d'O", Kunsthalle FRI-ART, Fribourg, Switzerland
'Creativity' (la créativité) "Die anderen Modernen", Haus der Kulturen der Welt, Berlin, Germany
'The Guardians of the World', 1997/98 (Les veilleurs du monde) studio-session and exhibition at the Centre Culturel Français, Cotonou, Benin and Musée national d'arts d'Afrique et d'Océanie, Paris
'The First Year of Democracy' 1997–1998 (L'An 01 de la democratie) "Alternating Currents," second Johannesburg Biennial, South Africa

1998
 
'Cannibalism' (le canibalisme) "Roteiros, Roteiros, ...Roteiros" XXIV Biennale de São Paulo, Brazil
'The Philosophical Schools' (Les Écoles philosophiques)  7. Triennale der Klein-Plastik, Afrika-Europa", Stuttgart, Germany

1999

'Venise d'hier-Venise d'aujour d'hui' ('The Story of the Lion') a one-day installation for the Campo dell'Arsenale, June 10, hosted by Joint Adventures Art Projects and the Venice Biennial, awarded with the 'premio della giuria' (prize of the jury)
'Kunstwelten im Dialog',  Museum Ludwig Koeln, concept: Marc Scheps (Global Art Rheinland 2000) Against Georges Adégbo's will, the piece 'Death and Resurrection' (dedicated for a gallery exhibition in Paris 1997) was partially installed. His offer to create a site specific installation for the occasion and city of Cologne was refused.

2000

'ForwArt' a choice, six curators-six artists, Harald Szeemann invited Georges Adéagbo who composed 'La colonisation Belge en Afrique noir' for this exhibition in Bruxelles hosted by the BBL (banque bruxelles lambert)
'La resurrection de Edith Piaf' in 'Voilà. le monde dans la tête.' Musée d'art moderne de la ville de Paris, ARC, France
'Hommage à Napoléon le grand' in 'la ville, le jardin, la mémoire', Rome, installation in the loggia and the garden of villa Medici, Rome, Italy 
'Partage de l'exotisme' at the fifth Biennale de Lyon, the piece 'La mort et la resurrection'('Death and Resurrection', created for the exhibition at Galerie Natalie Obadia, Paris 1997) was partially installed against the artists will.

2001

'Le Socialisme Africain' (African Socialism) in: 'The Short Century' by Okwui Enwezor four venues. Villa Stuck – Munich, Haus der Kulturen der Welt-Berlin, MCA-Chicago, P.S.1- New York (2002), USA
'Un espace...! Monde (histoire de l'art', 2001, in : Ein Raum ist eine Welt", Kunsthalle, Zurich, Switzerland

2002
 
'"L'explorateur et les explorateurs devant l'histoire de l'exploration".. !-Le théâtre du monde.. !' in : Documenta 11, Kassel, Germany

2004
 
'In the Bed' in: "In Bed." Toyota Municipal Museum of Art, Toyota, Aichi, Japan
'Dieu-créateur dans la création' Art Cologne, Stand Galerie Elisabeth Kaufmann, Germany
'AC-DC Archiv des Museum Ludwig' Rheinschau, Köln, Germany

2005

'Dieu-créateur dans la création' and 'AC-DC Archiv des Museum Ludwig' both in modified versions at Galerie Kaufmann, Zürich, Switzerland
«La Colonisation Belge en Afrique Noir » modified version in Belgique Visionnaire, Bozar, Bruxelles, curated by Harald Szeemann, Belgium
The Blake Byrne Collection, ed. The Museum of Contemporary Art, Los Angeles, USA

2006

‚Abraham, l'ami de Dieu- Philadelphia version' Philadelphia Museum of Art, USA ( In Notations: Out of Words" that included also Bruce Nauman, On Kawara, Glenn Ligon and Joseph Kosuth. http://www.philamuseum.org/exhibitions/2007/255.html.)

2007

« Créer le monde en faisant des collections- hommage a Christoph Weickmann » in Weickmann's Wunderkammer, Ulmer Museum, Germany
« Une espace avec le Monde » in „Beyond the Wall,"Stiftung Brandenburger Tor, Max Liebermann Haus, Berlin, Germany

2008

« Ephemeral Fringes » Art Brussels, Brussels, Belgium
"Regardez l'histoire!" in "See History 2008" Kunsthalle Kiel, 
"Intolerance" Ravello Festival, Sorento, Italy

2009

"Hypocrisy-The Sitespecifity of Morality", Oslo National Museum of Contemporary Art, Norway
„Fare Mondi" 53rd Venice Biennial, Italy

2010

„Transparancy" Trasparenze, Macro Futuro Rome, curated by Laura Cherubini and Sauro Bocchi, hosted by Fabula in Art, Italy
„Transparancy" Trasparenze, MADRE Napoli, Italy

2011

ARS 11, Kiasma Helsinki, Finland
ABSOLUTT INSTALLASJON National Museum for Art, Architecture and Design, Oslo, Norway, Reinstallation of the work commissioned for the exhibition "Hypocrisy" in 2009.

2012

Paris Triennial, Palais de Tokyo, curated by Okwui Enwezor, Paris, France
We Face Forward, Whitworth Art Gallery Manchester, UK
The Storytellers, The Stenersen Museum Oslo, Norway
Biennale Regard Benin 2012 Porto Novo and Togbin Plage, Benin

2013

"DECOLONIZE MÜNCHEN" at the Stadtmuseum München, Germany
"L'Allemagne avant la guerre et L'Allemagne après la guerre..!"
source: archive Georges Adéagbo 
www.jointadventures.org and https://www.facebook.com/georges.adeagbo

References
Bio from the National Museum of African Art

1942 births
Living people
20th-century Beninese sculptors
21st-century sculptors
Installation artists
People from Cotonou
20th-century Beninese male artists
21st-century Beninese male artists
Male sculptors